The Niagara Bible Conference (officially called the "Believers' Meeting for Bible Study") was held annually from 1876 to 1897, with the exception of 1884.  In the first few years it met in different resort locations around the United States.  Starting in 1883, it was held in Niagara-on-the-Lake, Ontario at the Queen's Royal Hotel and its pavilion.

The driving force behind the meeting was James H. Brookes, a Presbyterian minister from St. Louis.  Brookes publicized the meeting through his magazine Truth, and devoted substantial space to summaries of the speeches.
A typical example is his report from 1892, which describes the meeting as

Most of the speakers were dispensationalists, and the Niagara Conference introduced many evangelical Protestants to dispensationalist teaching.  The messages generally centered on the doctrines of Christ, the Holy Spirit, the Bible, missions and prophecy. Premillennialism and dispensationalism was defended and taught.  Most of the leading dispensationalsts of the late 19th and early 20th century attended the conference regularly, including William Eugene Blackstone, Charles Erdman, James H. Brookes, William Moorehead, Adoniram Judson Gordon, Amzi Dixon, C.I. Scofield, and James Hudson Taylor (who founded the China Inland Mission).

In 1890, the Believers' Meeting for Bible Study produced the document that came to be known as the "Niagara Creed." The Niagara Creed does not explicitly affirm dispensationalism, but it refers to several key dispensationalist beliefs, including the reality of the millennium, the restoration of Israel, and the distinction between the judgment of the saved and the damned.

References

Further reading 
In Pursuit of Purity: American Fundamentalism Since 1850, by David O. Beale 

Christian fundamentalism
Recurring events established in 1876
Recurring events disestablished in 1897
Christian conferences
19th-century church councils
Protestant councils and synods